Sawtooth eels are a family, Serrivomeridae, of eels found in temperate and tropical seas worldwide.

Sawtooth eels get their name from the human-like arrangement of inward-slanting teeth attached to the vomer bone in the roof of the mouth. They are deepwater pelagic fish.

Species
The 11 species are found in these two genera:

Family Serrivomeridae
 Genus Serrivomer
 Genus Stemonidium

References